Mary McGuckian (born 27 May 1963) is a film director, producer and screenwriter from Northern Ireland.

Early life
Born and brought up in Northern Ireland during The Troubles, McGuckian completed her formal education in the Republic of Ireland at Trinity College, Dublin (TCD), where she took a degree in engineering. It was during this time that she became involved with Trinity Players, appearing in many productions as well as producing, designing, directing and lighting various others.

Career
Her interest in theatre and politics led her to follow an autodidactic post graduate education in literature, theatre, acting and directing on various courses in London, Paris and Italy. During which time she wrote a number of avant-garde plays that were produced in England and Ireland. Most acclaimed was her long-running stage adaptation of Brian Merriman's poem "The Midnight Court".

Returning to Ireland, she continued to work as an actor and playwright and was invited to write screenplays in the emergent Irish film industry of the early 1990s. She set up her own company, Pembridge, to develop and produce feature film projects. The company was active as a co-producer on many Irish feature films and produced three films in Ireland which she wrote and directed: Words Upon the Window Pane, (adapted from the play by W.B. Yeats) in 1994, This Is the Sea (an adaptation of her own play Hazel) in 1996, and Best (the life story of Northern Irish footballer George Best) in 1999.

In 2001, she established Pembridge Pictures in the UK to develop and finance her adaptation of Thornton Wilder's The Bridge of San Luis Rey, which was shot in Spain and released in May 2004. Unhappy with the outcome of editorial interference by some of the film's producers, she did not support the release of the film.

This lead her to work on more modern filmmaking styles and she developed a process combining modern script narrative forms and extended character development work with collaborating actors who then improvise their own dialogue directly on set. Rag Tale, (2004) the first film of her "amorality trilogy", was conceived in this way and was followed by Intervention, (2007) and Inconceivable, (2008). Many of the revolving cast won awards for their work on the series and the exceptional ensemble revolved an international company of actors that included Lothaire Bluteau, Geraldine Chaplin, Simon Callow, Donna D'Errico, Lucy Davis, Michael Eklund, Kerry Fox, Rupert Graves, Ian Hart, David Hayman, Jennifer Jason Leigh, Suzan-Lori Parks, Cal MacAninch, Andie MacDowell, Malcolm McDowell, Elizabeth McGovern, Jordi Molla, Bill Patterson, Amanda Plummer, John Sessions, Sarah Stockbridge and Jennifer Tilly.

The company of cast and crew involved in the making of the 'amorality trilogy' went on to make the Cannes Film Festival satirical comedy The Making of Plus One. It was completed and presented during the Cannes Film Festival in May 2009.

In 2010 she wrote and directed an English language version of Man on the Train starring Larry Mullen Jr and Donald Sutherland, based on Patrice LeConte's L'Homme du Train originally starring Johnny Hallyday and Jean Rochefort.

In 2012 she worked with Eric Roberts on an improvised film entitled The Novelist. The film was never completed.

Her more recent films have focussed on female empowerment stories and include:

The Price of Desire (2015) which is the story of the inception of 20th-century architecture told in the context of how Le Corbusier completely erased the legacy of Irish Architect and Designer Eileen Gray. The cast included Irish actress Orla Brady as Eileen Gray, Swiss actor Vincent Perez as her nemesis Le Corbusier and Francesco Scianna as well as Alanis Morissette. The film premiered at the 2015 Jameson Dublin International Film Festival.

A Girl from Mogadishu (2019) which stars Aja Naomi King, Barkhad Abdi and Maryam Mursals in the story of Irish Somali activist, Ifrah Ahmed's journey from war-torn Somalia to global activist. It premiered at the 2019 Dublin International Film Festival and Edinburgh International Film Festival, and it won the Audience Award at the 42nd edition of the Mill Valley Film Festival. Other awards included the Audience and Jury awards at the Semaine de Cinema Britannique in France and the Cinema For Peace Foundation award for its contribution to Women's Empowerment during the 2020 Berlin Film Festival.

Personal life 
She was married to John Lynch in 1997. They separated in 2008.

Filmography

Director
2022 - The Bridge of San Luis Rey Remastered 
2018 - A Girl from Mogadishu
2014 - The Price of Desire
2011 - The Novelist
2011 - Man on the Train 
2010 - The Making of Plus One
2008 - Inconceivable
2007 - Intervention
2005 - Rag Tale
2004 - The Bridge of San Luis Rey
2000 - Best
1997 - This Is the Sea
1994 - Words Upon the Window Pane

Screenwriter
2018 - A Girl from Mogadishu
2014 - The Price of Desire
2011 - The Novelist
2011 - Man on the Train
2010 - The Making of Plus One
2008 - Inconceivable
2007 - Intervention
2005 - Rag Tale
2004 - The Bridge of San Luis Rey
2000 - Best
1997 - This Is the Sea
1994 - Words Upon the Windowpane

Producer
2022 - The Bridge of San Luis Rey Remastered 
2018 - A Girl from Mogadishu
2014 - The Price of Desire
2011 - The Novelist
2011 - Man on the Train
2010 - The Making of Plus One
2008 - Inconceivable
2007 - Intervention
2005 - Ragtale
2004 - The Bridge of San Luis Rey
2000 - Best
1997 - This Is the Sea
1994 - Words Upon the Windowpane

References

External links
 
 http://pembridge.pictures

1965 births
Living people
British film directors
English-language film directors
British women film directors
Alumni of Trinity College Dublin